The Distillery, Wine and Allied Workers' International Union (DWAW) was a labor union representing workers involved in making alcoholic drinks in the United States.

History
The union was founded in 1940 as the Distillery, Rectifying and Wine Workers' International Union, and was chartered by the American Federation of Labor on December 20.  It transferred to the new AFL-CIO in 1955, and by 1957, it had 25,000 members.

In 1963, the union renamed itself as the Distillery, Rectifying, Wine and Allied Workers' International Union of America, becoming the DWAW in 1978.  By 1980, the union's membership had risen slightly, to 26,600.  On October 11, 1995, it merged into the United Food and Commercial Workers' International Union.

Presidents
1940: Joseph O'Neil
1958: Mort Brandenburg
1974: George Oneto
1985: George Orlando

References

External links

Food processing trade unions
Trade unions established in 1940
Trade unions disestablished in 1995